RCC can stand for:

Technology
 Radio common carrier, a service provider for public mobile service
 radio-controlled clock
 Ringing choke converter, a switched-mode power supply
 Recompression chamber, a chamber used to treat divers from decompression sickness
 Remote center compliance, a device used in robotic assembly

Medical
 Renal cell carcinoma
 Red cell count

Substances
 Reinforced carbon–carbon
 Reinforced cement concrete
 Roller-compacted concrete

Organizations
 Rescue coordination centre
 Roman Catholic Church
 Radio Communications Committee of the IEEE Communications Society
 Range Commanders Council of the Inter-Range Instrumentation Group
 RCC Broadcasting Company, Japanese TV station
 Red Cross of Constantine, the common colloquial name of a Masonic order
 Regional Cancer Centre (India).
 Regional Commonwealth in the field of Communications, the conference of communications regulators from the Commonwealth of Independent States.
 Egyptian Revolutionary Command Council
 Iraqi Revolution Command Council
 Libyan Revolutionary Command Council
 Syrian Revolutionary Command Council
 Revolutionary Command Council for National Salvation in Sudan
 Rape crisis center
 RCC Broadcasting, a Japanese commercial broadcaster

Schools
 Rachel Carson Center for Environment and Society, in Munich, Germany
 RCC Institute of Technology, in Toronto, Ontario, Canada
 Recaredo Castillo College, in Surigao del Sur, Philippines
 Regional Computer Center, regional educational institutions located across India 
 Riverside Community College District, or RCCD, headquartered in Riverside, California, United States
 Riverside City College, an RCCD campus located in Riverside
 Rockingham Community College, in Wentworth, North Carolina, United States
 Rockland Community College, in Ramapo, New York, United States
 Rogue Community College, in the Rogue Valley region of Oregon, United States
 Roxbury Community College, in Boston, Massachusetts, United States
 Royal College of Chemistry, in London, England
 Royal College Curepipe, in Curepipe, Mauritius
 RCC Institute of Information Technology in India
 Royal College, Cinnamon Gardens, Colombo 7, Sri Lanka

Sport
 Richmond Cricket Club, an English cricket club
 Richmond Cricket Club, an Australian cricket club, now known as Monash Tigers
 Ringwood Cricket Club, an Australian cricket club

Buildings
 Ramanujan Computing Centre
 Redcar Central railway station, England; National Rail station code RCC

Other
 Rail City Casino, a casino located in Sparks, Nevada
 RecentChangesCamp, an unconference focused on wikis
 Region connection calculus, used for spatial-temporal reasoning
 relaxed Chebyshev center
 Rescue coordination centre
 River continuum concept
 Red Carpet Club
 Resource Compiler, a QT tool

See also

 
 RC2 (disambiguation) 
 R2C (disambiguation) 
 RC (disambiguation)